Grapholita funebrana, the plum fruit moth or red plum maggot, is a moth of the family Tortricidae. It is found in the Palearctic realm. Like many of its congeners, it is sometimes placed in Cydia.

The wingspan is 10–15 mm. The forewings are fuscous, striated with dark fuscous. The costa is posteriorly obscurely strigulated with whitish. The angulated edge of the basal patch and the are central fascia darker, the space between them is obscurely striated with whitish irroration towards dorsum. The ocellus is obscurely whitish-irrorated, edged with leaden -metallic, and it includes two or three blackish marks. The hindwings are fuscous, darker posteriorly. bThe larva is pale reddish ; head blackish ; plate of 2 pale ochreous.

The moth flies in two generations from late April to September.

The larvae feed on Prunus domestica, Prunus spinosa and other Prunus species. The species is considered to be a pest.

Notes
The flight season refers to Belgium and The Netherlands. This may vary in other parts of the range.

References

Grapholitini
Moths of Asia
Tortricidae of Europe
Moths described in 1835
Taxa named by Georg Friedrich Treitschke